The Angeles National Forest (ANF) of the U.S. Forest Service is located in the San Gabriel Mountains and Sierra Pelona Mountains, primarily within Los Angeles County in southern California. The ANF manages a majority of the San Gabriel Mountains National Monument.

The national forest was established in 1908, incorporating the first San Bernardino National Forest and parts of the former Santa Barbara and San Gabriel National Forests. Angeles National Forest headquarters are located in Arcadia, California.

Geography
It is located just north of the densely inhabited metropolitan area of Greater Los Angeles.

While primarily within Los Angeles County, a small part extends eastward into southwestern San Bernardino County, in the Mount San Antonio ("Mount Baldy") area, and a tiny section also extends westward into northeastern Ventura County, in the Lake Piru area.

The San Gabriel Mountains National Monument, established in 2014 and managed by the U.S. Forest Service, is largely within the Angeles National Forest.

The John D. Dingell Jr. Conservation, Management, and Recreation Act of 2019 established the Saint Francis Dam Disaster National Memorial and Saint Francis Dam Disaster National Monument at and around the ruins of the St. Francis Dam in the Forest's San Francisquito Canyon.

Wilderness areas
The Angeles National Forest contains five nationally designated wilderness areas. Two of these also extend into neighboring San Bernardino National Forest: 
 Cucamonga Wilderness — mostly in San Bernardino National Forest
 Magic Mountain Wilderness
 Pleasant View Ridge Wilderness
 San Gabriel Wilderness
 Sheep Mountain Wilderness — partially in San Bernardino National Forest

Climate

History
The San Gabriel Forest Reserve was established on December 20, 1892, the San Bernardino Forest Reserve was established on February 25, 1893, and the Santa Barbara Forest Reserve was established on December 22, 1903. Together, they became National Forests on March 4, 1907, and they were combined on July 1, 1908, with all of the San Bernardino forest and portions of San Gabriel forest and Santa Barbara forest composing the new Angeles National Forest. In 1916, there was a movement to create the Sierra Madre National Park, but that never occurred.

On September 30, 1925, portions of the Angeles National Forest and the Cleveland National Forest were detached to re-establish the San Bernardino National Forest.

Angeles National Forest is registered as California Historical Landmark #717, for being the first National Forest in the state.

The campgrounds at Broken Blade, Twisted Arrow and Pima Loops were closed on July 26, 2013, after squirrel infected with bubonic plague was discovered.

Wildfires

Loop Fire

On 1 November 1966, a fire started at 5:19a.m. on the Los Pinetos Nike Site (LA-94). The fire spread, threatening medical facilities and residential areas south edge of the national forest. 12 firefighters with United States Forest Service's El Cariso "Hot Shot" crew were killed they were caught in a flare up in a canyon. 11 more firefighters were seriously burned in the incident. The fire was brought under control on at 1:00p.m. on 2 November, having burned .

Station Fire

The fire burned for more than a month and was the worst in Los Angeles County history, charring , approximately one-fourth of the forest; displacing wildlife, and destroying 91 homes, cabins and outbuildings and the family-owned Hidden Springs Cafe.

During the fire, two firefighters died after driving off the Mt. Gleason County Road looking for an alternate route to get the inmates out at Camp 16. The Station Fire threatened the Mount Wilson Observatory atop Mt. Wilson . The site includes two telescopes, two solar towers, and transmitters for 22 television stations, several FM radio stations, and police and fire department emergency channels. Although the fire scorched one side of the outhouse at amateur-owned Stony Ridge Observatory, six miles northeast of Mt. Wilson, aside from minor damage from smoke and ash infiltration, the remainder of the observatory and its historic 30-inch Carroll telescope survived.

Bobcat Fire (2020)

In September and October 2020, the Bobcat Fire burned  (468 km2) in the central San Gabriel Mountains of the Angeles National Forest. It was one of the largest wildfires in Los Angeles County history.

Natural history

The Angeles National Forest manages the habitats, flora and fauna ecosystems, and watersheds. Some of the rivers with watersheds within its boundaries provide valuable non-groundwater recharge water for Southern California. The existing protected and restored native vegetation absorb and slow surface runoff of rainwater to minimize severe floods and landslides in adjacent communities. The land within the forest is diverse, both in appearance and terrain. The Pacific Crest Trail crosses the forest.

Flora

Much of this National Forest is covered with dense chaparral shrub forests with oak woodlands, which changes to pine and fir-covered slopes in the higher elevations. Subsequent to the fire there was a heavy growth of poodle-dog bush, apparently triggered by the fire's effect on dormant seeds, that lasted for several years. The plant produces prolific lavender flowers. Unfortunately, as visitors to the Forest discovered, contact with it may cause a poison-oak-like rash.

Tree species for which the forest is important include bigcone Douglas-fir (Pseudotsuga macrocarpa), Coulter pine (Pinus coulteri), and California walnut (Juglans californica).

Fauna
This forest is home to black bears, gray foxes, bobcats, mountain lions, mule deer, bighorn sheep, rattlesnakes and coyotes.

Access
A National Forest Adventure Pass is required for parking at many locations in the Angeles National Forest and other National Forests in Southern California, and this can be obtained online or from visitor centers and local merchants. Los Angeles County has declared that passes are not required on county-maintained roads. There are also many other areas that do not require the pass.

General information

 Acres of land: 700,176 (2652 km2)
 Wilderness areas acres: 80,284 (324.9 km2)
 Miles of roads: 1,032 (1661 km)
 Visitor centers: 4
 Information centers: 4
 Fire lookout towers: 2
 Recreational residences: 505
 Picnic areas: 36
 Campgrounds: 66
 Ski areas: 2
 Entrance stations: 2

Ranger Districts 
 Los Angeles Gateway Ranger District
 Station: San Fernando, California
 San Gabriel Mountains National Monument
 Station: Glendora, California

Trails
 Trailheads: 53
 Trail miles: 697 (1122 km)
 Off highway vehicle areas: 3
 Off highway vehicle route miles: 261 (420 km)

Natural features

 Wilderness areas: 5
 Lakes and reservoirs: 10
 Rivers and stream miles: 240

Sensitive species
 Sensitive plants: 22
 Sensitive wildlife: 23
 Threatened & endangered species: 16

Mountain peaks

Mountains within the Angeles National Forest include:
 Mount San Antonio  — also known as "Mt. Baldy"
 Pine Mountain 
 Dawson Peak 
 Mount Harwood 
 Mount Baden-Powell  
 Throop Peak 
 Mount Burnham 
 Telegraph Peak (California) 
 Mount Islip  — site of historic Mt. Islip fire lookout tower 
 Waterman Mountain 
 Iron Mountain (Los Angeles County) 
 South Mount Hawkins  Lookout destroyed in Curve Fire 2002
 Mount Gleason 6,502 ft
 San Gabriel Peak 
 Mount Disappointment (California) 
 Vetter Mountain  — site of historic Vetter Mountain fire lookout tower
 Burnt Peak 
 Mount Wilson  — location of the Mount Wilson Observatory
 Mount Lowe (California) 
 Mount Lukens 
 Echo Mountain 
All the above mountains are part of the San Gabriel Mountains, except for Burnt Peak, which is in the Sierra Pelona Mountains.

Water recreation
The lake is managed by the L.A. County Department of Parks and Recreation
It can completely dry up in drought years.
 Crystal Lake is a small natural lake located near the northern end of Highway 39.

Volunteer organizations
 Angeles National Forest Fire Lookout Association: Restoration and operation of fire lookout towers in the ANF
 Altadena Mountain Rescue Team: Saving lives through mountain rescue and safety education
 Concerned Off-Road Bicyclists Association: Restoration and maintenance of multi-use trails in the ANF
 Sierra Madre Search & Rescue: A group of dedicated volunteers committed to saving lives in the wilderness
 San Gabriel Mountains Trailbuilders: California's hiking and nature trail repair group
 West Fork Conservancy: Maintains the West Fork of the San Gabriel River and Beer Creek
 Angeles Volunteer Association: Organizes Visitor Center information, trail repair, and a broad spectrum of forestry efforts
 Fisheries Resource Volunteer Corps: works with the Forest Service, helping with various projects during the year
 San Dimas Mountain Rescue Team: Highly trained mountain rescue team http://www.savetheeastfork.org/
 Los Angeles County Sheriff's Air Rescue 5: Volunteer Reserve Deputy Sheriffs are paid $1 a year for their work
 Save The East Fork Association: Works along the East Fork of the San Gabriel River 
 Helping Our Mountain Environment: HOME—Glendora Mountain Road (GMR) trash and spray paint cleaning 
Lowelifes Trail Crew: Lowelifes focuses on trail work in Southern California's Angeles National Forest, fostering conservation, sustainability, & community in Los Angeles County.

Gallery

California Historical Landmark
The California Historical Landmark Marker NO. 717 at San Gabriel Mountain, Clear Creek vista point, State Hwy 2, 8.3 mi N of I-210, La Canada reads:
NO. 717 THE ANGELES NATIONAL FOREST - The first national forest in the State of California and second in the United States, Angeles National Forest was created by proclamation of President Benjamin Harrison on December 20, 1892. The first name given to the forest, "'San Gabriel Timberland Reserve," was changed to "San Gabriel National Forest" March 4, 1907, and then to "Angeles National Forest" on July 1, 1908..

See also

 
 
 Henninger Flats
 Los Padres National Forest—adjacent northwest
 San Bernardino National Forest—adjacent on east

References

Further reading

External links

 Official Angeles National Forest website—at National Forest Service (Accessed 05 Dec 2014)
 Crystal Lake Recreation Area—Largest campground in the Angeles National Forest (Accessed 05 Dec 2014)
 Southern California Trails at Local Hikes (Accessed 05 Dec 2014)
 Hiking Trails around Wrightwood, in the Angeles National Forest—Wrightwood Hiking Trails (Accessed 05 Dec 2014)
 Mountains around Wrightwood, in the Angeles National Forest—San Gabriel Mountains (Accessed 05 Dec 2014)
 Canyons and Valleys around Wrightwood, in the Angeles National Forest—Canyons and Valleys in the Angeles National Forest (Accessed 05 Dec 2014)
Photograph of Angeles National Forest fire bulldozer transport December 2017 - saved at archive.org
Image of vacationers at Crystal Lake, Angeles National Forest, 1935. Los Angeles Times Photographic Archive (Collection 1429). UCLA Library Special Collections, Charles E. Young Research Library, University of California, Los Angeles.

 
National Forests of California
Parks in Los Angeles County, California
Protected areas of Los Angeles County, California
Protected areas of the Mojave Desert
Angeles
Sierra Pelona Ridge
California Historical Landmarks
Parks in Southern California
Protected areas established in 1908
1908 establishments in California
Protected areas of Southern California
Tourist attractions in Los Angeles County, California